Knox County is a county in the U.S. state of Illinois. According to the 2020 census, it had a population of 49,967. Its county seat is Galesburg.

Knox County comprises the Galesburg, IL Micropolitan Statistical Area.

History
Knox County was named in honor of Henry Knox, the first US Secretary of War.

The first "Knox County" in what today is Illinois was unrelated to the modern incarnation. In 1790, the land of the Indiana Territory that was to become Illinois was divided into two counties: St. Clair and Knox. The latter included land in what was to become Indiana. When Knox County, Indiana, was formed from this portion of the county in 1809, the Illinois portions were subdivided into counties that were given other names.

The modern Knox County, Illinois, was organized in 1825, from Fulton County, itself a portion of the original St. Clair County.

Like its neighbor to the south, Fulton County, for its Spoon River Drive, Knox County is also known for a similar scenic drive fall festival the first two weekends in October, the Knox County Drive.

Geography

Climate and weather

Public Transit
 Galesburg station
 Burlington Trailways
 Galesburg Transit
 List of intercity bus stops in Illinois

Major highways

  Interstate 74
  U.S. Highway 34
  U.S. Highway 150
  Illinois Route 8
  Illinois Route 17
  Illinois Route 41
  Illinois Route 78
  Illinois Route 97
  Illinois Route 164
  Illinois Route 116
  Illinois Route 167
  Illinois Route 180

Adjacent counties
 Mercer County - northwest
 Henry County - north
 Stark County - east
 Peoria County - southeast
 Fulton County - south
 Warren County - west

Demographics

As of the 2010 United States Census, there were 52,919 people, 21,535 households, and 13,324 families residing in the county. The racial makeup of the county was 87.5% white, 7.2% black or African American, 0.6% Asian, 0.2% American Indian, 1.9% from other races, and 2.5% from two or more races. Those of Hispanic or Latino origin made up 4.8% of the population. In terms of ancestry, 23.1% were German, 14.9% were Irish, 11.7% were English, 11.6% were Swedish, and 8.0% were American.

Of the 21,535 households, 27.2% had children under the age of 18 living with them, 45.7% were married couples living together, 11.9% had a female householder with no husband present, 38.1% were non-families, and 32.3% of all households were made up of individuals. The average household size was 2.27 and the average family size was 2.84. The median age was 42.0 years.

The median income for a household in the county was $39,545 and the median income for a family was $51,740. Males had a median income of $42,067 versus $25,380 for females. The per capita income for the county was $20,908. About 10.9% of families and 15.5% of the population were below the poverty line, including 24.7% of those under age 18 and 7.3% of those age 65 or over.

Communities

Cities
 Abingdon
 Galesburg
 Knoxville
 Oneida

Villages

 Altona
 East Galesburg
 Henderson
 London Mills (mostly in Fulton County)
 Maquon
 Rio
 St. Augustine
 Victoria
 Wataga
 Williamsfield
 Yates City

Census-designated places
 Gilson
 Oak Run

Other unincorporated communities

 Appleton
 Centerville
 Columbia Heights
 Dahinda
 Delong
 Douglas
 Elba Center
 Henderson Grove
 Hermon
 Ontario
 Rapatee
 Saluda
 Soperville
 Trenton Corners
 Truro
 Uniontown

Townships
Knox County is divided into twenty-one townships:

 Cedar
 Chestnut
 Copley
 Elba
 Galesburg
 Galesburg City
 Haw Creek
 Henderson
 Indian Point
 Knox
 Lynn
 Maquon
 Ontario
 Orange
 Persifer
 Rio
 Salem
 Sparta
 Truro
 Victoria
 Walnut Grove

Politics
Knox County's political history is typical of Yankee-settled Northern Illinois. It leaned Whig during its early elections – although giving a plurality to Franklin Pierce in 1852 – and become powerfully Republican following that party's formation. Although Knox did support Progressive Theodore Roosevelt against conservative incumbent President William Howard Taft in 1912, it was Franklin D. Roosevelt’s 1932 landslide before Knox County again gave the Democratic Party so much as a plurality, and it did not give a Democratic absolute majority until Lyndon B. Johnson gained such against the anti-Yankee, Southern-leaning Barry Goldwater in 1964.

Since then, Knox County gradually trended Democratic for the following four decades, so that Michael Dukakis in his losing 1988 campaign was able to carry the county by the same margin as Johnson had done in 1964. During the 1990s and 2000s, Knox was a solidly Democratic county, voting Democratic by at least nine percentage points in every election from 1992 to 2012. The 2016 election, in the shadow of high unemployment in the “Rust Belt” saw a swing of over twenty percentage points to Donald Trump, who became the first Republican victor in the county since Ronald Reagan in 1984.

See also
 National Register of Historic Places listings in Knox County, Illinois

References

Further reading
 Charles C. Chapman and Co., History of Knox County, Illinois: Together with Sketches of the Cities, Villages and Townships; Record of its Volunteers in the Late War; Educational, Religious, Civil and Political History; Portraits of Prominent Persons and Biographical Sketches of the Subscribers; History of Illinois, Abstracts of the State Laws, Etc., Etc., Etc. Chicago: Blakely, Brown and Marsh, Printers, 1878.
 Fred R. Jelliff, Annals of Knox County: Commemorating Centennial of Admission of Illinois as State of the Union in 1818. Galesburg, IL: Republican Register Printing, 1918.
 Portrait and Biographical Album of Knox County, Illinois, Containing Full Page Portraits and Biographical Sketches of Prominent and Representative Citizens of the County, Together with Portraits and Biographies of All the Governors of Illinois, and of the Presidents of the United States: Also Containing a History of the County from Its Earliest Settlement Up to the Present Time. Chicago: Biographical Publishing Company, 1886.

External links
 "Foxie's Knox Co., IL AHGP"

 
Illinois counties
1825 establishments in Illinois
Populated places established in 1825
Galesburg, Illinois micropolitan area